Airthrey may refer to:

A house at Wallace High School, Stirling
Airthrey Castle, on the grounds of the University of Stirling